Eastern Tasmanian is an aboriginal language family of Tasmania in the reconstruction of Claire Bowern.

Languages
Bayesian phylogenetic analysis suggests that four (at p < 0.20) to five (at p < 0.15) Eastern Tasmanian languages are recorded in the 26 unmixed Tasmanian word lists (out of 35 lists known). These cannot be shown to be related to other Tasmanian languages based on existing evidence. The languages are:

Oyster Bay (Central–Eastern Tasmanian) (2)
Oyster Bay (Oyster Bay and Big River tribes)
Little Swanport
Bruny (Southeastern Tasmanian) (2–3, Bruny tribe)
Southeast Tasmanian
Bruny Island

Two of the lists reported to be from Oyster Bay contain substantial Northeastern admixture (see Northeastern Tasmanian languages), which Bowern believes to be responsible for several classifications linking the languages of the east coast. However, once that admixture is accounted for, the apparent links disappear.

Descendants 
The Flinders Island lingua franca was based primarily on Eastern and Northeastern Tasmanian languages. The English-based Bass Strait Pidgin continued some vocabulary from the lingua franca. 
The constructed language Palawa kani is based on many of the same languages as the lingua franca.

References

 
Indigenous Australian languages in Tasmania

Language families